was an admiral in the Imperial Japanese Navy and the flag officer of the task force centered around the battleship  on her final mission towards the end of World War II.

Biography

Early career
Born in Miike County Takada Town (present day Miyama City, Fukuoka Prefecture), Itō graduated from the 39th class of the Imperial Japanese Naval Academy in 1911. He was 15th in a class of 148 cadets, and served as midshipman on the cruiser  and battleship .

His rise through the ranks was regular and rapid: ensign on December 1, 1912, sub-lieutenant on December 1, 1914, and lieutenant on December 1, 1917.

Itō returned to the Naval Staff College in 1923, graduating from the 21st class as a lieutenant commander. Itō visited the United States from May–December 1927, and was promoted to commander on his return. He became captain on December 1, 1931, and was assigned as naval attaché to Manchukuo from March 1932-November 1933. Along with Admiral Isoroku Yamamoto, Itō, well aware of the disparity in resources and industrial strength between the United States and Japan, was an outspoken proponent of maintaining good relations with the United States.

Later career

In November 1933, Itō was given his first command as captain of the light cruiser . In November 1935, he was reassigned to command the newly commissioned heavy cruiser . In April 1936, he was given command of the heavy cruiser . In December 1936, Itō was assigned command of the battleship .

On December 1, 1937, Itō became a rear Admiral and was appointed Chief of Staff to the 2nd Fleet. The following year, he was named chief of the Navy Ministry's Personnel Bureau. After serving for two years, Itō commanded Cruiser Division 8 (CruDiv 8) in November 1940 until his appointment as Chief of Staff of the Combined Fleet in April 1941.

In September of that year, Itō became Vice Chief of the Imperial Japanese Navy General Staff and was promoted to vice admiral a month later on October 15, 1941. He held this post until December 1944, when he was placed in command of the 2nd Fleet, based on the Inland Sea.

In early April 1945, Ito commanded the last major offensive by the Imperial Japanese Navy when he led the battleship  on its final sortie accompanied by the light cruiser  and eight destroyers in Operation Ten-Go, which aimed to destroy United States Navy during the Battle of Okinawa. Itō initially opposed the mission, which he viewed as futile and wasteful, but ultimately relented, after being informed that the Emperor was expecting the Navy to mount some kind of attack. On 7 April 1945, U.S. aircraft sighted the Japanese ships heading for Okinawa and subsequently several hundred American carrier aircraft attacked them. With no Japanese air support available, the Japanese ships were overwhelmed, and Yamato, Yahagi, and four of the destroyers were sunk by multiple bomb and torpedo hits. After ordering the mission cancelled and for the remaining escorts to rescue survivors, Itō chose to go down with the Yamato.

Itō was posthumously promoted to full admiral. Ten days after his death, his only son died taking part in a kamikaze attack near Okinawa.

In film
In Toei's 2005 war film Yamato (男たちの大和 Otokotachi no Yamato), Itō was portrayed by Japanese actor Tetsuya Watari.
In Shūe Matsubayashi's 1981 film Rengō Kantai 連合艦隊 (lit. "Combined Fleet", later released in the United States as The Imperial Navy), Itō was portrayed by Kōji Tsuruta.
In Shūe Matsubayashi's 1963 film Taiheiyo no tsubasa 太平洋の翼 (lit. "Wings Over the Pacific", later released in the United States under the titles Attack Squadron! and Kamikaze), Itō was portrayed by Susumu Fujita.
In Yutaka Abe's 1953 film Senkan Yamato 戦艦大和 (lit. "Battleship Yamato"), Itō was portrayed by Minoru Takada.

References

Books

 — First-hand account of the battle by the captain of the Japanese cruiser Yahagi.
 — Anthology of articles by former officers of the Imperial Japanese Navy and Air Defense Force

 — A first-hand account of the battle by Yamatos only surviving bridge officer.

External links

Notes

1890 births
1945 deaths
People from Miyama, Fukuoka
Imperial Japanese Navy admirals
Japanese admirals of World War II
Military personnel from Fukuoka Prefecture
Japanese military personnel killed in World War II
Captains who went down with the ship
Japanese naval attachés